Šiauliai University Botanical Garden is a botanical garden established in 1997 and operated by the Šiauliai University, and located at Paitaičių str. 4, Šiauliai, Lithuania.

Botanical Garden is a member of the Lithuanian Association of University Botanical Gardens (LAUBG), the Association of Baltic Botanic Gardens (ABBG), the Botanic Garden Conservation International (BGCI) and the Network of Botanic Gardens in the Baltic Sea Region.

Collections 
Accession Number: 4000

Special collections: Systematic and plant geography collection – 905 species, Ericaceae family plants – 300 taxa, Ornamental plants – 1200 taxa, Alpine plants – 987 species, Ligneous plants – 600 species. Lithuanian native flora – 180 taxa.

References

External links 
 Official website
 Šiauliai University Botanical Garden on BGCI

1997 establishments in Lithuania
Šiauliai University
Botanical gardens in Lithuania